The Women's team sprint event of the 2016 UCI Track Cycling World Championships was held on 2 March 2016. Initially, China won the final against Russia, but were relegated to silver after an illegal change.

Results

Qualifying
The qualifying was started at 15:07.

Finals
The finals were started at 20:50.

References

Women's team sprint
UCI Track Cycling World Championships – Women's team sprint